Elephant Eyelash is the first studio album by American band Why?. It was released by Anticon on September 26, 2005. Prior to the formation of the band in 2004, Yoni Wolf had used "Why?" as his stage name for his solo work.

The title refers to an erection. Why? said: "An 'elephant eyelash' is a hard-on. I like to make my own pantheon of slang. Isn't having a hard-on kind of vulnerable? It's an anticipation."

Critical reception
At Metacritic, which assigns a weighted average score out of 100 to reviews from mainstream critics, Elephant Eyelash received an average score of 76% based on 14 reviews, indicating "generally favorable reviews".

Josh Berquist of PopMatters gave the album 8 stars out of 10, calling it "one of the best records released this year."

Track listing

Personnel
Credits adapted from the album's liner notes.

 Yoni Wolf – music, production, recording, artwork
 Josiah Wolf – music, production, recording
 Doug McDiarmid – music
 Matt Meldon – music
 Anna Stewart – additional vocals (3)
 John Ringhoffer – trombone (5)
 Dee Kesler – violin (5)
 Doseone – additional vocals (6, 8)
 Jel – drum programming (9)
 Brian Wilson – additional vocals (10)
 Colin Guthrie – recording (1, 12)
 Jud Lee – recording (1, 12)
 Mike Walti – recording (1, 12)
 Tony Espinoza – mixing
 Brian Gardner – mastering
 Odd Nosdam – layout

References

External links
 

2005 debut albums
Why? (American band) albums
Anticon albums